Francisc Papp (born 17 December 1946) is a Romanian rower. He competed at the 1968 Summer Olympics and the 1972 Summer Olympics.

References

1946 births
Living people
Romanian male rowers
Olympic rowers of Romania
Rowers at the 1968 Summer Olympics
Rowers at the 1972 Summer Olympics
Sportspeople from Arad, Romania